This is a list of current or former military airfields within the English county of Norfolk, East Anglia. They may have been used by the Royal Flying Corps (RFC), Royal Naval Air Service (RNAS), Royal Air Force (RAF), Army Air Corps (AAC), Fleet Air Arm (FAA), United States Army Air Forces (USAAF) or the United States Air Force (USAF).

For a list of current RAF stations in the UK and abroad, see List of Royal Air Force stations and for former stations see List of former Royal Air Force stations.

References

External links
 Royal Air Force official website
 Control Towers website
 USAAF bases
 Airfields tours and map, British Tours

Military history of Norfolk
 
Geography of Norfolk
Airfields